Karina Le Fevre is a female international table tennis player from England.

Table tennis career
She represented England at the 2010 World Table Tennis Championships and 2016 World Table Tennis Championships in the Corbillon Cup (women's team event).

She competed in the 2014 Commonwealth Games and plays for the Ormesby Club.

See also
 List of England players at the World Team Table Tennis Championships

References

English female table tennis players
Living people
1993 births
Table tennis players at the 2014 Commonwealth Games
Commonwealth Games competitors for England